The New Year Honours 1911 were appointments by King George V to various orders and honours to reward and highlight good works by members of the British Empire. They were announced on 3 January 1911.

The Most Honourable Order of the Bath

Knight Grand Cross (GCB)
Military Division
Admiral Sir Archibald Lucius Douglas, G.C.V.O., K.C.B.

Order of the Star of India

Knight Grand Commander (GCSI)
Sir Steuart Colvin Bayley, K.C.S.I., C.I.E., formerly Lieutenant-Governor of Bengal
Sir Dennis Fitzpatrick, K.C.S.I., formerly Lieutenant-Governor of the Punjab
Sir William Lee-Warner, K.C.S.I. Member of the Council of India

Knight Commander (KCSI)
John Ontario Miller, Esq., C.S.I., Indian Civil Service, lately an Ordinary Member of the Council of the Governor-General of India
Lionel Montague Jacob, Esq., C.S.I.. M.I.C.E., Secretary to the Government of India, Public Works Department, and an Additional Member of the Council of the Governor-General of India for making Laws and Regulations
Murray Hammick, Esq.. C.S.I., C.I.E., an Ordinary Member of the Council of the Governor of Fort St. George

Companion (CSI)
Colonel (temporary Major-General) Reginald Henry Mahon, C.B., Director-General of Ordnance in India
Michael William Fenton, Esq., Indian Civil Service, Chief Secretary to the Government of the Punjab, and an Additional Member of the Council of the Lieutenant-Governor of the Punjab for making Laws and Regulations
Lieutenant-Colonel Alexander Fleetwood Pinhey, C.I.E., Indian Army, lately Private Secretary to His Excellency the Governor-General of India
Captain Allen Thomas Hunt, Royal Navy, in command of 
Henry Walter Badock, Esq., Accountant-General, India Office
James Mollison, Esq., Inspector-General of Agriculture with the Government of India
Pirajiraos Bapu Saheb Ghatge, C.I.E., Chief of Kagal (Senior Branch), Kolhapur

Order of Saint Michael and Saint George

Knight Grand Cross (GCMG)
The Right Honourable Lord Balfour of Burleigh, P.C., K.T.; in recognition of services in connection with the Royal Commission on trade relations between Canada and the West Indian Colonies
The Right Honourable Lord Robson, P.C., in recognition of services in connection with the North Atlantic Coast Fisheries Arbitration

Knight Commander (KCMG)
The Right Honourable Lord Islington, D.S.O., Governor and Commander-in-Chief of the Dominion of New Zealand
Reginald Laurence Antrobus, Esq., C.B., a Crown Agent for the Colonies
Ernest Woodford Birch, Esq., C.M.G., British Resident, Perak
The Honourable Allen Bristol Aylesworth, K.C., Minister of Justice of the Dominion of Canada; in recognition of services in connection with the North Atlantic Coast Fisheries Arbitration
Henry Paul Harvey, Esq., C.B., Financial Adviser to the Egyptian Government
Richard Frederick Crawford, Esq., one of His Majesty's Commissioners of Customs; in commemoration of the establishment of the Union of South Africa
The Right Honourable Frederick Robert Moor, D.C.L., Senator of the Union of South Africa; one of the delegates from Natal to the South African National Convention
Sir James Percy FitzPatrick, Kt., Member of the House of Assembly of the Union of South Africa; one of the delegates from the Transvaal to the South African National Convention
The Honourable Nicolaas Frederic de Waal, Administrator of the Province of the Cape of Good Hope
The Honourable Edward Philip Solomon, Senator of the Union of South Africa
The Honourable Thomas William Smartt, Member of the House of Assembly of the Union of South Africa; one of the delegates from the Cape of Good Hope to the South African National Convention
The Honourable Edgar Harris Walton, Member of the House of Assembly of the Union of South Africa; one of the delegates from the Cape of Good Hope to the South African National Convention
Abe Bailey, Esq., lately Member of the Legislative Assembly of the Transvaal

Companion (CMG)
Lieutenant-Colonel Henry Robert Smith, I.S.O., Sergeant-at-Arms of the House of Commons of the Dominion of Canada
George Handley Knibbs, Esq., Commonwealth Statistician, Commonwealth of Australia
Frederick Manson Bailey, Esq., Colonial Botanist of the State of Queensland
Lieutenant-Colonel Francis William Panzera, Resident Commissioner, Bechuanaland Protectorate
John Penry Lewis, Esq., M.A., late Government Agent for the Central Province of the Island of Ceylon
James Crawford Maxwell, Esq., District Commissioner, Sierra Leone
Major Richard Alfred Poer O'Shee, R.E.; in recognition of services in connection with the Anglo-Portuguese Boundary Commission, East Africa, 1904–1906, and the Anglo-French Boundary Commission, Niger and Lake Chad, 1906–1909
Major John Arthur Hannyngton; in recognition of services in Somaliland
Colonel George Samuel Abercrombie Harvey, Pasha, Commandant of the Cairo City Police
Evelyn Mountstuart Grant Duff, Esq., His Majesty's Consul-General at Buda-Pesth
Philip Alphonso Somers Cocks, Esq., His Majesty's Consul at Lisbon

in commemoration of the establishment of the Union of South Africa

Albert Browne, Esq., I.S.O., one of the delegates from the Orange River Colony to the South African National Convention

Order of the Indian Empire

Knight Commander (KCIE)
Rear-Admiral Edmond John Warre Slade, M.V.O., Royal Navy, Commander-in-Chief, East Indies
John Benton, Esq., C.I.E., F.C.H., M.I.C.E., Inspector-General of Irrigation with the Government of India

Companion (CIE)
John Barry Wood, Esq., Indian Civil Service, Deputy Secretary to the Government of India, Foreign Department
Lieutenant-Colonel George Grant Gordon, V.D., Commandant, Northern Bengal Mounted Rifles, and an Additional Member of the Council of the Lieutenant-Governor of Bengal for making Laws and Regulations
Colonel Ralph Champneys Broome, Indian Army, Director-General, Army Remount Department
Colonel Frank Goodwin, V.D., Locomotive Superintendent, Rajputana-Malwa Railway, and Commandant, 2nd Battalion, Bombay, Baroda and Central India Railway Volunteer Rifles
Lieutenant-Colonel George Frederick Chenevix-Trench, Indian Army, Political Agent in Zhob
Archibald Young Gipps Campbell, Esq., Indian Civil Service, Private Secretary to the Governor of Madras
Andrew Bigoe Barnard, Esq., Bengal Police Department, Deputy Director Criminal Intelligence
James Adolphus Guider, Esq., Superintendent of Police, Bombay
John Paul Warburton, Esq., Punjab Police Department (retired), lately Inspector-General of Police, Patiala State
James William Douglas Johnstone, Esq., Director General of Education, Gwalior State
Fakir Sayad Iftakhar-ud-din, Punjab Provincial Service, and some time British Agent at Kabul

Royal Victorian Order

Member, 5th Class
Joseph Morris, Esq., Superintendent of the Line, Great Western Railway Company (with effect from December 21, 1910)
Robert Turnbull, Esq., Superintendent of the Line, London and North-Western Railway Company (with effect from January 2, 1911)

References

New Year Honours
1911 in the United Kingdom
1911 awards